Edward Filgate (16 September 1915 – 19 January 2017) was an Irish Fianna Fáil politician who served for five years as Teachta Dála (TD) for the Louth constituency.

He was first elected to the 21st Dáil at the 1977 general election. He was re-elected twice, at the 1981 and the February 1982 general elections. He did not contest the November 1982 general election.

He and his wife, Elish, had five children. Elish died in 1989. One of 11 children, he lived in the township of Priorstate, in his native village of Louth, near Dundalk, next to the site of the house he grew up in. He was the final member of the family to permanently live in the village. He became a centenarian in September 2015 and died on 19 January 2017, aged 101. He is buried in the graveyard of the Church of the Immaculate Conception in Louth.

References

1915 births
2017 deaths
Irish centenarians
Fianna Fáil TDs
Members of the 21st Dáil
Members of the 22nd Dáil
Members of the 23rd Dáil
Men centenarians
Local councillors in County Louth
Politicians from County Louth